Taqi Ahmed is a Pakistani television and film actor. Mostly known for his work in Urdu serials, Ahmed did his acting course from the National Academy of Performing Arts and then struggled at various platforms for acting break. His debut series was Dekh Magar Pyar Se aired in 2011 on Aaj TV. In 2019, he made his film debut with Tevar opposite Sukaina Khan.

Career 

His appearances include Kaash Main Teri Beti Na Hoti, Gohar-e-Nayab, Mera Naam Yousuf Hai, Dil Awaiz, Kitni Girhain Baaki Hain, Titli, Karamat-e-Ishq, Madventures, Makafaat and Lal Mai. Currently, Ahmed is appearing in Horror series Lal Mai on Aaj Entertainment.

Filmography

Film 
Tevar

Television

References

External links 

Living people
Pakistani male television actors
Year of birth missing (living people)
Pakistani film actors